This is the list of honors bestowed on Stanisław Lem.

 1955: Gold Cross of Merit (Poland)
 1957 – City of Kraków's Prize in Literature (Nagroda Literacka miasta Krakowa) for the totality of the literary work, with the special mention of Time Not Lost
1959: Officer's Cross of the Order of Polonia Restituta
 1965 – Prize of the Minister of Culture and Art, 2nd Level (Nagroda Ministra Kultury i Sztuki II stopnia)
 1970: 
Commander's Cross of the Order of Polonia Restituta
Prize of the Minister of Foreign Affairs for popularization of Polish culture abroad (nagroda Ministra Spraw Zagranicznych za popularyzację polskiej kultury za granicą)
1973  Literary Prize of the Minister of Culture and Art (nagroda literacka Ministra Kultury i Sztuki) and honorary member of Science Fiction Writers of America
 1976 – State Prize 1st Level in the area of literature (Nagroda Państwowa I stopnia w dziedzinie literatury)
 1979
Order of the Banner of Work of the 2nd class
 Grand Prix de Littérature Policière for his novel Katar.
 A minor planet, 3836 Lem, discovered by Soviet astronomer Nikolai Stepanovich Chernykh in 1979, is named after him.
 1981 – Doctor honoris causa honorary degree from the Wrocław University of Technology
 1986 – Austrian State Prize for European Literature 
 1987 Honorary title "Person of Merit for National Culture" ("Zasłużony dla kultury narodowej"), Polish Council of State
 1991 – Austrian literary 
 1994 – member of the Polish Academy of Learning
 1996 – recipient of the Order of the White Eagle
 1997 – honorary citizen of Kraków
 1998 – Doctor honoris causa: University of Opole, Lviv University, Jagiellonian University
 2003 – Doctor honoris causa of the University of Bielefeld
 2005 - Medal for Merit to Culture – Gloria Artis (on the list of the first recipients of the newly introduced medal)
 2007 
A street in Kraków is to be named in his honour.
 An exoplanet named Pirx was found orbiting the K-type main sequence star Solaris about 161 light-years (49 parsecs, or nearly  km) from Earth in the constellation Pegasus.
 2009 – A street in Wieliczka was named in his honour
 2011 – An elaborate interactive Google Doodle inspired by The Cyberiad was created and published in his honor for the 60th anniversary of his first published book: The Astronauts.
 2013  – two planetoids were named after Lem's literary characters: 343000 Ijontichy, after Ijon Tichy and 343444 Halluzinelle, after Tichy's holographic companion Analoge Halluzinelle from German TV series Ijon Tichy: Space Pilot

References

Stanisław Lem
Commemoration of Stanisław Lem